Maddali Usha Gayatri (born 26 April 1955) is an Indian Kuchipudi exponent, danseuse, guru and choreographer from the state of Andhra Pradesh. A recipient of Hamsa Award (now Kala Ratna), she received critical acclaim for her choreography and performances. She performs ballets in mythological, historical and social themes. One of her works, Nrityam Darsayami, included a troupe of 12 of her disciples performing for 12 hours uninterruptedly.

Early life and education 
Usha Gayatri was born on 26 April 1955 to Mallavarapu Sundaresam and Janakamma in Kurnool, Andhra State (now in Andhra Pradesh). has a sister, Uma Gayatri, who is a musician. She completed her Master of Arts from Hyderabad Central University in 1988. She researched and published her thesis on the role of Satyabhama, second queen-consort of Hindu god Krishna, in the growth of Telugu literature, development and incarnation in dance from Potti Sreeramulu Telugu University.

Training in dance 
Gayatri started training in dance, when she was 4 years old, from Sri Dayal Saran. Despite being trained in Kathak, Odissi and music, her interests directed towards Kuchipudi. She thus learned Kuchipudi from her guru, Vedantam Jagannath Sarma, at his dance institute Kuchipudi Kalakshetra in Hyderabad. She trained in Yakshagana, a theatre form, from V. Satyanarayana Sarma, Vempati Chinna Satyam and Vedantam Prahlada Sarma and learned  (the art of conducting a performance with rythmic music using two cymbals) from Kamalarani.

Career 
In June 2010, Gayatri choreographed a ballet Alamelu Manga Charitham on the narrative of Hindu goddess Alamelu Manga, consort of Venkateswara, and Alamelu Mangapuram. While the performances were well received, the mythological ballet was criticized for deviating from the sthala purana, the religious account of a Hindu temple, of Venkateswara Temple in Tirumala. Later in July, she performed Rukmini-Satya, a ballet incorporating the characters of Rukmini and Satyabhama, first and second queen-consorts of Krishna, together and performed both the roles. She developed Rukmini's part of the play based on Pothana Bhagavatham and Sri Krishna Leela Tarangini; and used Siddhendra Yogi's Bhamakalapam for Satyabhama. She was praised for her performance and comprising two different characterizations in a single ballet.

In March 2011, she presented a ballet Matru Devo Bhava in which she played the mythological motherly roles of Parvati, Leelavati, Sita, Yashoda and Vakula Devi. Scripted by Bnim, she received commendation for her performance and choreography. In August, she performed Kunti Vilapam, an account of the life of Kunti, mother of the Pandavas in ancient Hindu epic Mahabharata, based on the writings by Jandhyala Papayya Sastry. She received praise for her performance and the composition of the ballet.

Later in June 2013, she performed a ballet under the title Shodasa Krishnam showcasing the adventures of Krishna which she composed from various works, including that of Annamacharya. She was praised for her choreography and performance in various characters in divergent themes. In July 2015, marking the 30th anniversary of her dance academy, Nritya Kinnera, she choreographed two ballets – Pushkara Pulakita Godavari and Amrapali. Pushkara Pulakita Godavari, scripted by Bnim, is themed around the Pushkaram of the Godavari River in which she played the role of Hindu deity Brihaspati, while in Amrapali, she played the role of The Buddha.

In May 2016, Gayatri released a book titled Kuchipudi Art and Satyabhama describing Satyabhama and choreographed a ballet based on Bhamakalapam. She instated excerpts from other poets on the literature surrounding Satyabhama in her play, including the scores of Narayana Teertha, Nandi Thimmana and Tarigonda Vengamamba. She received critical acclaim for her performance and choreography. Later that year during June–July, she toured across Europe in a group of 40 Kuchipudi exponents and folk artists and performed in several ballets. In February 2017, she performed a ballet Swetcha Bharat narrating the story of Indian history from Vedic period until the Indian independence movement. Scripted by Bnim, she took upon the role of Bharat Mata, the national personification of India as a mother goddess, for which she received acclaim.

She also performs ballets on historical themes and social values. She also choreographed Nrityam Darsayami which included a troupe of 12 of her disciples performing for 12 hours uninterruptedly dancing 72 concepts of Kuchipudi.

Other work 
Gayatri worked in Punjab National Bank for over 25 years and retired voluntarily. She established Nritya Kinnera Kuchipudi dance academy in Hyderabad in 1983 where she teaches Kuchipudi. , 44 of her disciples debuted on stage from her institute under her supervision.

Awards 
Gayatri received several honours for her contributions among which Hamsa Award (now Kala Ratna) was conferred by the government of united Andhra Pradesh in 2001.

Personal life 
Gayatri married  who is also an artist and runs Kinnera Art Theatre. They have a son whose wife, Soundarya Kaushik, is also a Kuchipudi exponent and has debuted on stage in August 2014 supervised by Gayatri.

Published works

References 

1955 births
Living people
People from Kurnool
Artists from Hyderabad, India
Kuchipudi exponents
Dancers from Andhra Pradesh
Dancers from Telangana
20th-century Indian dancers
21st-century Indian dancers
20th-century Indian women artists
21st-century Indian women artists
Indian female classical dancers
Recipients of the Kala Ratna
University of Hyderabad alumni
Telugu people
Potti Sreeramulu Telugu University alumni
Indian dance teachers
Teachers of Indian classical dance